David Geaney may refer to:

 David Geaney (Castleisland Gaelic footballer)
 David Geaney (Kerry Gaelic footballer, born 1985)